The German Democratic Party (or DDP) was a liberal political party in the Weimar Republic, considered centrist or centre-left. Along with the right-liberal German People's Party (or DVP), it represented political liberalism in Germany between 1918 and 1933. It was formed in 1918 from the Progressive People's Party and the liberal wing of the National Liberal Party, both of which had been active in the German Empire.

After the formation of the first German state to be constituted along pluralist-democratic lines, the DDP took part as a member of varying coalitions in almost all Weimar Republic cabinets from 1919 to 1932. Before the Reichstag elections of 1930, it united with the People’s National Reich Association, which was part of the nationalist and anti-Semitic Young German Order. From that point on the party called itself the German State Party (or DStP) and retained the name even after the Reich Association left the party. Because of the connection to the Reich Association, members of the left wing of the DDP broke away from the party and toward the end of the Republic founded the Radical Democratic Party, which was unsuccessful in parliament. Others joined the Social Democratic Party of Germany (SPD).

After the National Socialists took power, the German State Party was dissolved on 28 June 1933 as part of the process of Gleichschaltung (coordination) by means of which the Nazis established totalitarian control over German society.

Weimar Republic

Emergence of the DDP 

On 16 November 1918, one week after the November Revolution that brought down the monarchy after Germany’s defeat in World War I, an appeal for the founding of a new democratic party, written by the editor-in-chief of the Berliner Tageblatt Theodor Wolff and signed by 60 well-known people, appeared in the morning edition of the paper under the headline ‘The Great Democratic Party’. An almost identical statement was published at the same time by the Vossische Zeitung (Voss’s Newspaper). Four days later members of the Progressive People's Party, which had participated in the last two governments of the German Empire in 1917/18, and the liberal wing of the National Liberal Party joined with Wolff, sociologist Max Weber, economist Alfred Weber, lawyer Hugo Preuß and others to found the German Democratic Party (DDP).

In 1910 the left-liberal Progressive People's Party had emerged from the Free-minded People’s Party, the Free-minded Union and the German People’s Party (or DtVP) of the German Empire (the latter not to be confused with the German People’s Party (DVP) of the Weimar Republic). It was this new party and the comparatively small left wing of the former National Liberal Party of the Empire that under Wolff and his associates merged to form the new German Democratic Party in 1918. The DDP united those holding democratic and liberal ideals and common positions on national and social issues but distanced itself from the wartime annexation policy of the former National Liberals of the Empire. The main representative of that point of view, Gustav Stresemann, who at the time still saw himself as a monarchist, went on to found a party that was somewhat more hostile to the republic, the German People's Party (DVP).

No other party identified itself as unreservedly with the parliamentary democracy of the Weimar Republic as the DDP; no other party professed individual freedom and social responsibility so unequivocally. The crucial framers of the Weimar Constitution came from the ranks of the DDP. Hugo Preuß authored the draft version of the constitution that was passed by the Weimar National Assembly; Max Weber served as advisor to the drafting committee; Conrad Haußmann was vice president and chairman of the Constitutional Committee of the National Assembly; and Friedrich Naumann, a member of the Weimar National Assembly and considered one of the ‘Fathers of the Constitution’, was elected DDP chairman at the First Party Congress in July 1919.

The party strove for a unified federal state and demanded – like almost all other parties – a revision of the Treaty of Versailles that had imposed harsh terms on Germany after its defeat in World War I. The DDP supported the League of Nations as an institution for the peaceful reconciliation of interests between states. In social policy, the party was close to the reform efforts of the Hirsch-Duncker Trade Associations whose aim was to implement social reform through cooperation between employees and employers, following the example of English trade unions. The DDP also sought a balance between the social and economic policy ideas of labor and the middle classes through cooperation with the Social Democratic Party of Germany (SPD). The DDP supported the principle of private enterprise but also called for the possibility of state intervention. Because of its clear commitment to liberalism and the parliamentary system, the DDP was the target of constant attacks from the ranks of the nationalist and conservative German National People’s Party (or DNVP) and the German Ethnic Freedom Party (or DVFP).

The program of the DDP was a synthesis of liberal and social ideas. In the pre-war period, such a fusion had been attempted by Friedrich Naumann.  He was a Protestant theologian and came from the Christian social movement. Supporters and members of the party were recruited primarily from the liberal professions, teachers, and university lecturers, i.e., from the educated middle classes, or Bildungsbürgertum. It was also supported by executives and civil servants, industrialists mainly from the chemical and electrical industries and liberal Jews. More Jews voted for the DDP than for any other party. It was therefore dubbed the "party of Jews and professors".

In addition to Naumann, prominent members of the DDP included Hugo Preuß (the ‘father’ of the Weimar Constitution) and Foreign Minister Walther Rathenau. The DDP provided a home for politically active women in the Weimar Republic such as Marie-Elisabeth Lüders who in the 1950s was named ‘’ of the West German Bundestag, an honorific given to the oldest or longest-serving member. Physicist Albert Einstein co-signed the DDP’s founding document but was not an active party member. (See also the 'Notable Members' section below.)

Along with the SPD, the DDP was one of the staunchest supporters of the Weimar Republic. Party strongholds were found in Berlin, Potsdam, Schleswig-Holstein, Württemberg, the Weser-Ems area, and especially in Hamburg, where the 1919 to 1924 party leader Carl Wilhelm Petersen was First Mayor and head of government.

In the first nationwide elections to the National Assembly of the still young republic, the DDP received 18 percent of the vote and in 1919/1920 formed the Weimar Coalition with the SPD and the Catholic Centre Party as the first government of the Weimar Republic. While the party counted around 800,000 members one year after its founding, by 1927 its membership had dropped to 117,000. In spite its steadily dwindling size, the DDP played an important political role in the early years of the Republic. For one, its position between the SPD and the Centre Party helped stabilize the Weimar Coalition nationwide and especially in Prussia. Wilhelm Abegg, for example, the state secretary in the Prussian Ministry of the Interior, reorganized and modernized the Prussian police. In addition, members of the DDP formed an important reservoir of personnel for high positions in public administration. No other party was able to provide to a similar extent civil servants who both possessed the professional training and were loyal to the democratic system of the Weimar Republic, something that was not the case with the mostly monarchist and anti-democratic civil servants inherited from the Empire.

Decline during the 1920s 
In 1920 the DDP had already lost votes, in large measure to the German People's Party, German National People’s Party, and to parties focused on single issues. This was due to disagreements within the DDP over how to deal with the Versailles Peace Treaty, of which some deputies approved. The loss of votes was accompanied by a simultaneous loss of members, finances and journalistic support. Important newspapers such as the Vossische Zeitung and the Frankfurter Zeitung held views that were close to those of the DDP, but the party was never able to establish an important party paper of its own such as the SPD’s Vorwärts or later the Nazi Party’s Völkischer Beobachter. The prejudice that the DDP was the ‘party of big capital’ held credence among part of the public, a prejudice that was factually false and charged with anti-Semitism. In later years, the Nazi Party exploited this by defaming the DDP as ‘the Jewish party’.

Another reason for the decline was their program of ‘social capitalism’ in which workers and owners mutually recognized "duty, right, performance and profit" and where solidarity was to prevail between employees, workers and owners. This visionary idea was out of touch with the reality of rising unemployment and economic difficulties under the pressure of the Treaty of Versailles.

Renaming to the German State Party 
In July 1930 the DDP united with the People’s National Reich Association (VNR) to form the German State Party, initially for the upcoming Reichstag elections. This brought fierce conflicts within the party, as the VNR was the political arm of Artur Mahraun's conservative and anti-Semitic Young German Order. After the merger many members of the left wing, including Ludwig Quidde and Hellmut von Gerlach, left the party and in 1930 founded the Radical Democratic Party, which was largely unsuccessful politically. The Young German Orden broke away from the DDP immediately after the Reichstag elections, but the DDP nevertheless formally renamed itself the German State Party (DStP) in November 1930.

Until 1932 the DStP participated in the majority of Reich governments, but in the elections of that year it received only about one percent of the vote and sank to insignificance. In the March 1933 elections, after Adolf Hitler had been named chancellor, the DStP obtained five seats in the Reichstag with the help of a combined list with the SPD. The five DStP deputies, as opposed to the SPD, voted for the Nazi-sponsored Enabling Act, which effectively disempowered the Reichstag. Their "yes" to the Enabling Act was justified by the deputy Reinhold Maier. The final sentence of his speech read: "In the interest of the people and the Fatherland and in the expectation of lawful developments, we will put aside our serious misgivings and agree to the Enabling Act."

Development after the Nazi seizure of power

Self-dissolution in 1933 
Since the mandates of the DStP’s Reichstag deputies had been won by means of nominations from the Social Democratic Party, they expired in July 1933 based on a provision of the Gleichschaltung Law of 31 March 1933. The self-dissolution of the DStP, forced by the National Socialists, took place on 28 June 1933. The law against the formation of new parties enacted on 14 July codified the existence of a single party in the Nazi state, the NSDAP, and any activity on behalf of other parties was made a punishable offense.

Resistance to National Socialism 

Individual members of the DStP participated in the resistance to National Socialism. The only left-liberal resistance group, the Robinsohn-Strassmann group, consisted mainly of former DDP/DStP members. A middle-class resistance circle with about sixty members was the Sperr Circle in Bavaria. It consisted of the diplomat Franz Sperr as well as the former Weimar Reich ministers and DDP members Otto Geßler and Eduard Hamm. Many former members of the DDP and Radical Democratic Party also found themselves forced into exile either because of their stance against the regime or their pacifist attitudes, among them Ludwig Quidde and Wilhelm Abegg. Others were murdered by the National Socialists, including Fritz Elsas.

DDP politicians after World War II 
After World War II former members of the DDP were instrumental in founding both the West German Free Democratic Party (FDP) – for example Theodor Heuss, Thomas Dehler and Reinhold Maier – and the East German Liberal Democratic Party (LDPD) – including Wilhelm Külz, Eugen Schiffer and Waldemar Koch – while others such as Ernst Lemmer, Ferdinand Friedensburg and August Bach went to the Christian Democratic Union (CDU), or the Social Democratic Party, including Erich Lüth. Otto Nuschke became leader of the East German CDU.

The youth organization Young Democrats, which had been close to the DDP, continued to exist until 2018.

Election results

Party chairmen of the DDP and DStP

Noted members of the DDP and DStP 

 Gertrud Bäumer (1873–1954), women's rights activist
 Thomas Dehler (1897–1967), lawyer
 Bernhard Dernburg (1865–1937), banker
 Hermann Dietrich (1879–1954), Reich Minister of Agriculture and Finance, Vice Chancellor and party chairman
 Hellmut von Gerlach (1866–1935), publisher
 Otto Geßler (1875–1955), Reich Minister of Defense
 Adolf Grimme (1889–1963), cultural politician
 Willy Hellpach (1877–1955), psychologist
 Theodor Heuss (1884–1963), journalist and university lecturer
 Elly Heuss-Knapp (1881–1952), social reformer
 Harry Graf Kessler (1868–1937), art collector and diplomat
 Erich Koch-Weser (1875–1944), party chairman
 Wilhelm Külz (1875–1948), Reich Minister of the Interior and Lord Mayor of Dresden
 Helene Lange (1848–1930), women's rights activist
 Ernst Lemmer (1898–1970), trade union leader
 Marie-Elisabeth Lüders (1878–1966), women's rights activist
 Thomas Mann (1875–1955), writer
 Reinhold Maier (1889–1971), lawyer
 Friedrich Meinecke (1862–1954), historian
 Friedrich Naumann (1860–1919), party leader and publisher
 Otto Nuschke (1883–1957), journalist
 Friedrich von Payer (1847–1931), parliamentary group chairman
 Carl Wilhelm Petersen (1868–1933), party chairman
 Hugo Preuß (1860–1925), constitutional lawyer and Reich Minister of the Interior
 Ludwig Quidde (1858–1941), historian, publisher and pacifist
 Walther Rathenau (1867–1922), industrialist and Reich Foreign Minister
 Hjalmar Schacht (1877–1970), Reichsbank president
 Gerhart von Schulze-Gaevernitz (1864–1943), national economist
 Wilhelm Solf (1862–1936), diplomat
 Ernst Troeltsch (1865–1923), theologian
 Alfred Weber (1868–1958), national economist and sociologist
 Max Weber (1864–1920), sociologist and national economist
 Eberhard Wildermuth (1890–1952), director of the German Construction and Land Bank
 Theodor Wolff (1868–1943), journalist

Pictures

See also 
 Liberalism in Germany
 Democratic Party of Germany
 Liberalism
 List of liberal parties
 National League of German Democratic Youth Clubs, youth wing of the party
 Weimar Republic

References

Further reading

1918 establishments in Germany
Centrist parties in Germany
Classical liberal parties
Germany 1918
Defunct political parties in Germany
Liberal parties in Germany
Political parties established in 1918
Political parties disestablished in 1930
Political parties in the Weimar Republic
Progressivism in Germany
Radical parties
Social liberal parties